Santa Maria is an administrative region in the Federal District in Brazil.

Notable people
Felipe Anderson Football player

See also
List of administrative regions of the Federal District

References

External links

 Regional Administration of Santa Maria website
 Government of the Federal District website

Administrative regions of Federal District (Brazil)